Marquez is a city in Leon County, Texas, United States. The population was 263 at the 2010 census.

Geography

Marquez is located at  (31.240121, –96.255336).

Demographics

As of the census of 2000, there were 220 people, 90 households, and 59 families residing in the city. The population density was 183.3 people per square mile (70.8/km2). There were 113 housing units at an average density of 94.1/sq mi (36.4/km2). The racial makeup of the city was 81.82% White, 8.64% African American, 1.36% Native American, 8.18% from other races. Hispanic or Latino of any race were 12.27% of the population.

There were 90 households, out of which 31.1% had children under the age of 18 living with them, 52.2% were married couples living together, 11.1% had a female householder with no husband present, and 34.4% were non-families. 33.3% of all households were made up of individuals, and 20.0% had someone living alone who was 65 years of age or older. The average household size was 2.44 and the average family size was 3.14.

In the city, the population was spread out, with 25.9% under the age of 18, 5.5% from 18 to 24, 25.5% from 25 to 44, 22.7% from 45 to 64, and 20.5% who were 65 years of age or older. The median age was 41 years. For every 100 females, there were 94.7 males. For every 100 females age 18 and over, there were 87.4 males.

The median income for a household in the city was $18,333, and the median income for a family was $34,375. Males had a median income of $29,286 versus $12,250 for females. The per capita income for the city was $14,122. About 27.9% of families and 29.1% of the population were below the poverty line, including 34.1% of those under the age of eighteen and 22.7% of those 65 or over.

Education
The City of Marquez is served by the Leon Independent School District.

References

Cities in Texas
Cities in Leon County, Texas